Hendrik Jan Willem "Henk" Cornelisse (born 16 October 1940) is a retired Dutch cyclist. His sporting career began with Olympia Amsterdam. He won a bronze medal in the 4 km team pursuit along with  Cor Schuuring, Gerard Koel and Jaap Oudkerk at the 1964 Summer Olympics. He also won the Ronde van Noord-Holland and Ronde van Overijssel in 1962 and one stage of the Olympia's Tour in 1964.

See also
 List of Dutch Olympic cyclists

References

1940 births
Living people
Dutch male cyclists
Olympic cyclists of the Netherlands
Cyclists at the 1964 Summer Olympics
Olympic bronze medalists for the Netherlands
Olympic medalists in cycling
Cyclists from Amsterdam
Medalists at the 1964 Summer Olympics
20th-century Dutch people
21st-century Dutch people